Phytohabitans suffuscus is a bacterium from the genus Phytohabitans which has been isolated from roots from an orchid in Okinawa Prefecture, Japan.

References 

Micromonosporaceae
Bacteria described in 2010